Marcus Lorenzo Storey (born November 9, 1982) is an American former soccer player who played as a forward.

Career
Storey was born in Chicago, Illinois. He played college soccer at the University of North Carolina. Following being named the ACC Rookie of the Year in 2001, Storey was named to the All-ACC first team as a junior and a senior. He finished his career with the Tar Heels with 39 goals and 19 assists in 106 games.

Upon his graduation, Storey was drafted 20th overall in the 2005 MLS SuperDraft by the Columbus Crew. He was traded to Houston prior to the 2006 season. However, after spending the season with the Dynamo, he was cut during the 2007 pre-season, a move to make the team roster-compliant.

In January 2008 he joined TuS Heeslingen in Germany, in the Oberliga (Fourth division), he left the club in June 2008 and he joined SV Wilhelmshaven in the new (Third division) and on June 30, 2009 left Wilhelmshaven to sign for SV Drochtersen/Assel.

References

External links
 

Living people
1982 births
People from Missouri City, Texas
American soccer players
Association football forwards
Major League Soccer players
USL League Two players
North Carolina Fusion U23 players
North Carolina Tar Heels men's soccer players
Columbus Crew draft picks
Columbus Crew players
Houston Dynamo FC players
TuS Heeslingen players
SV Wilhelmshaven players
SV Drochtersen/Assel players
BSV Schwarz-Weiß Rehden players
Soccer players from Houston
American expatriate soccer players
American expatriate soccer players in Germany